Elections to Bury Council were held on 7 May 1998.  One third of the council was up for election and the Labour Party kept overall control of the council.  Overall turnout was 26.85%.

After the election, the composition of the council was:
Labour 39
Conservative 6
Liberal Democrat 3

Election result

Ward results

References

1998 English local elections
1998
1990s in Greater Manchester